Jane Austin may refer to:

Misspelling of Jane Austen (1775–1817), English writer
Jane G. Austin (1831–1894), American writer